Sket Dance is an anime series adapted from the manga series of the same name by Kenta Shinohara. Sket Dance follows the adventures of the Sket-dan, a high school club dedicated towards helping the students and teachers of Kaimei High School with their problems, as they do whatever it takes to help make their campus a better place. The anime was directed by Keiichiro Kawaguchi, and produced by Tatsunoko Production. It premiered on April 7, 2011 on TV Tokyo. 

On March 30, 2011, Crunchyroll announced that they would simulcast the series. Episodes are available to premium users world-wide every Thursday at 3 AM Pacific Standard Time (PST), 30 minutes after the episode airs in Japan. Free users are able to view the episodes one week after their launch. 

The anime adaptation ran for two seasons and officially ended on September 27, 2012, airing a total of 77 episodes.

Episodes from the series have been published in DVD. The first DVD compilation was released on August 28, 2011, with individual volumes being released monthly. As of May 24, 2013, 26 individual volumes have been released.

In September 24, 2021, in commemoration of the anime's 10th anniversary, it was announced that the anime will have a Blu-ray box set re-release titled "Sket Dance Memorial Complete Blu-ray", set to be released on December 24, 2021. It will include all seventy-seven episodes and the 2013 OVA.

On October 15, 2021, the first 25 episodes became available for streaming  in Japan on Amazon Prime Video. Episodes 26 to 51 will be made available on November 15, and episodes 52 to 77 will be made available on December 15.

Episode list

Season 1 (2011-2012)

Season 2: SECOND DANCE (2012)

OVA (2013)

DVD releases

Theme music
The anime uses nineteen pieces of theme music: six opening themes and thirteen ending themes.

References 

Lists of anime episodes